The 21st Vanier Cup was played on November 30, 1985, at Varsity Stadium in Toronto, Ontario, and decided the CIAU football champion for the 1985 season. The Calgary Dinos won their second championship by defeating the Western Mustangs by a score of 25-6.

References

External links
 Official website

Vanier Cup
Vanier Cup
Vanier Cup
Vanier Cup